Psycho is a 2013 Telugu thriller film written by Ram Gopal Varma and directed by Kishore Bhargava. The film is touted to be treated with Rogue film making.

Plot
Meera (Priyanka Kothari) appears as a responsible middle-class girl who runs her home by doing a job. Her father is a retired employee. Brother dreams of becoming a football player like Ronaldo. Her colleague in office Shekar loves her but she does not accept it. Meera meets Nikhil in a bus. After regularly travelling in the bus both turn friends. When closeness starts developing between them, Nikhil shows his real side. After knowing Nikhil's intentions and true nature, Meera avoids him and maintains distance from him. Unable to digest this, Nikhil starts stalking Meera. He goes on harassing Meera with vulgar messages, calls and even goes to the extent of threatening and humiliating her. Unable to bear this Meera goes to a Police Station and complains. But police do not take her complaints seriously. With no sign of help coming from anyone, she approaches Shekar. How Shekar reacts to her problems, what's psycho's reaction for that, how Meera faces this situation, did she come out of this psycho attack are the issues covered in the rest of the story.

Cast
 Milind Gunaji
 Priyanka Kothari as Meera
 Raj Shroff as Nikhil
 Nakul Vaidya as Shekar
 Vijay Kashyap

References

External links

review

2010s Telugu-language films
2013 films